Nizar bin Obaid Madani (born 1941) was the state minister for foreign affairs of the Kingdom of Saudi Arabia.

Early life and education
Madani was born in Madinah in 1941. He obtained a Bachelor of Arts degree in economics and political science from Cairo University in 1964. He earned a master's degree in international relations at American University, Washington, D.C. in 1971. He received a PhD in international relations from the same university in 1977. His thesis is entitled The Islamic Content of the Foreign Policy of Saudi Arabia. King Faisal's Call for Islamic Solidarity 1965-1975.

Career
Madani joined the ministry of foreign affairs as an attaché in 1965 where he then proceeded to the Saudi embassy in Washington in 1968, eventually taking the position of Chargé d'affaires. In 1967, he was appointed director of media affairs. Then he was posted to take charge of international affairs in 1978, and then progressed to become assist manager, office of minister of foreign affairs in 1984. He also participated in several international conferences at the United Nations and in the Arab League. He was appointed in 1993 as a member of the Consultative Council in its first session, and he was then reappointed in 1997. Later, he became assistant foreign minister. He was appointed minister of state for foreign affairs on 29 August 2005.

He is a member of the Okaz publishing company.

References

External links

Nizar
Nizar
1941 births
American University School of International Service alumni
Cairo University alumni
Government ministers of Saudi Arabia
Living people
Members of the Consultative Assembly of Saudi Arabia
People from Medina